Glenn Turner (born 1 May 1984) is an Australian professional field hockey player from the Australian Capital Territory. He is a member of Australia men's national field hockey team and won a gold medal with them at the 2010 Commonwealth Games and a bronze medal at the 2012 Olympic Games. Turner also competed at the 2016 Olympic Games.

Personal
Turner is from the Australian Capital Territory. In November 2011, he had surgery.

Career
Turner is a striker. In state and territory based competitions, he represents the Australian Capital Territory. In 2006, 2007 and 2008 he represented the side as a member of the Canberra Lakers. He was a member of the Canberra Lakers in 2010.  In a June game against the Tassie Tigers that his side lost 2–1, he scored his team's only goal. In 2011, was again with the team. He played for the team in the first round of the 2011 season.

Turner is a member of the Kookaburras. In December 2007, he competed in the Dutch Series in Canberra. In 2009, he was a member of the national team during a five-game test series in Kuala Lumpur, Malaysia against Malaysia. He represented the country at the 2010 Commonwealth Games. In the gold medal match against India that Australia won 8–0, he scored a goal. In 2011, he was a member of the national team that competed at the Azlan Shah Cup in Malaysia. He had hip surgery during 2011 that kept him away from the national team for a while.

In December 2011, Turner was named as one of twenty-eight players to be on the 2012 Summer Olympics Australian men's national training squad.  This squad will be narrowed in June 2012.  He trained with the team from 18 January to mid-March in Perth, Western Australia. His inclusion as possible 2012 Olympian came after having only made regular appearances with the team shortly before that decision was made. In February during the training camp, he played in a four nations test series with the teams being the Kookaburras, Australia A Squad, the Netherlands and Argentina. He played for Kookaburras during the series. He scored a goal in his team's 2–1 victory over the Netherlands. In late February 2012, the Goulburn Workers Club in Goulburn, New South Wales hosted a fundraising event to help local Olympians, including Turner, compete at the 2012 Summer Olympics by assisting them financially.

References

External links
 
 
 
 

1984 births
Australian male field hockey players
Living people
Field hockey players at the 2012 Summer Olympics
Olympic field hockey players of Australia
Olympic bronze medalists for Australia
Olympic medalists in field hockey
Medalists at the 2012 Summer Olympics
Commonwealth Games gold medallists for Australia
Field hockey players at the 2016 Summer Olympics
Commonwealth Games medallists in field hockey
ACT Academy of Sport alumni
Hockey India League players
Field hockey players at the 2010 Commonwealth Games
Sportsmen from the Australian Capital Territory
2010 Men's Hockey World Cup players
2014 Men's Hockey World Cup players
Medallists at the 2010 Commonwealth Games